Athletes from the Federal Republic of Yugoslavia competed at the 2000 Summer Olympics in Sydney, Australia. 109 competitors, 92 men and 17 women, took part in 50 events in 14 sports. These would be the last Summer Games in which athletes from Montenegro and Serbia participated under the name of Yugoslavia. They would compete as Serbia and Montenegro at the 2004 Summer Olympics.

The final days of the Olympics were overshadowed by the protests of its president Slobodan Milošević.

Medalists

Athletics

Men
Track & road events

Field events

Women
Track & road events

Field events

Basketball

Team roster

|}
| valign="top" |
 Head coach

Legend
(C) Team captain
nat field describes country of last club before the tournament
Age as of 17 September 2000
|}

Group play

Quarter–finals

Boxing

Canoeing

Sprint 
Men

Women

Fencing

One female fencer represented Yugoslavia in 2000.

Handball

Team roster
Dejan Perić
Arpad Šterbik
Petar Kapisoda
Vladan Matić
Nenad Peruničić
Nedeljko Jovanović
Igor Butulija
Aleksandar Knežević
Žikica Milosavljević
Goran Đukanović
Ratko Đurković
Dragan Škrbić
Ratko Nikolić
Ivan Lapčević
Nebojša Golić
Head coach:Veselin Vujović

Group A

Quarterfinal

Semifinal

Brone medal game

Judo

Rowing

Shooting

Men

Women

Swimming

Men

Women

Table tennis

Tennis

Men's doubles

Volleyball

Men's team competition
Team roster
Vladimir Batez
Slobodan Boškan
Andrija Gerić
Nikola Grbić
Vladimir Grbić
Slobodan Kovač
Đula Mešter
Vasa Mijić
Ivan Miljković
Veljko Petković
Goran Vujević
Igor Vušurović
Head coach: Zoran Gajić

Pool B

|}

Quarterfinal

Semifinal

Final

Water polo

Men's team competition

Premliniary round

Quarterfinals

Semifinals

Bronze medal match

Roster
 Bronze Medal

 Aleksandar Šoštar
 Nikola Kuljača
 Vladimir Vujasinović
 Predrag Zimonjić
 Petar Trbojević

 Dejan Savić
 Aleksandar Ćirić
 Aleksandar Šapić
 Veljko Uskoković

 Jugoslav Vasović
 Nenad Vukanić
 Viktor Jelenić
 Danilo Ikodinović

Notes

Wallechinsky, David (2004). The Complete Book of the Summer Olympics (Athens 2004 Edition). Toronto, Canada. . 
International Olympic Committee (2001). The Results. Retrieved 12 November 2005.
Sydney Organising Committee for the Olympic Games (2001). Official Report of the XXVII Olympiad Volume 1: Preparing for the Games. Retrieved 20 November 2005.
Sydney Organising Committee for the Olympic Games (2001). Official Report of the XXVII Olympiad Volume 2: Celebrating the Games. Retrieved 20 November 2005.
Sydney Organising Committee for the Olympic Games (2001). The Results. Retrieved 20 November 2005.
International Olympic Committee Web Site
Serbian Olympic Committee

References

Nations at the 2000 Summer Olympics
2000
Olympics